Myospalax is a genus of rodents in the family Spalacidae. It contains these species of zokor:

False zokor, M. aspalax
Siberian zokor, M. myospalax
Transbaikal zokor, M. psilurus

References

 
Rodent genera
Taxa named by Erik Laxmann
Rodents of Asia